Shoshana (Shoshánna(h)) is a Hebrew feminine first name. It is the name of at least two women in the Bible and, via , it developed into such European and Christian names as Susanna, Susan, Susanne, Susana, Susannah, Suzanne, Susie, Suzie, Sanna and Zuzana. In Ethiopia it became Sosie, Sosina, Sosena, while in North Africa it yielded Sawsen and Sawsan.

In Biblical times  referred to a lily (from Lilium family); in modern Hebrew it refers to a rose.

Notable people with the name include:

 Soshana Afroyim (1927–2015), Austrian painter who adopted the name (with a variant spelling) during her stay in Israel
 Shoshana Arbeli-Almozlino (1926–2015), former Israeli politician who served as Minister of Health between 1986 and 1988
 Shoshana Bean (born 1977), American stage actress and singer known for her roles in Broadway musicals during the 2000s
 Shoshana Bush (born 1988), American actress
 Shoshana Damari (1923–2006), Yemenite-Israeli singer known as the queen of Hebrew music
 Shoshana Felman (born 1942), Woodruff Professor of Comparative Literature and French at Emory University
 Shoshanna Lonstein Gruss (born 1975), American fashion designer
 Shoshana Johnson (born 1973), Panamanian former United States soldier, the first black female U.S. prisoner of war
 Shoshana Kamin (born 1930) Soviet-born Israeli mathematician
 Shoshana Lew (born 1983), executive director of the Colorado Department of Transportation
 Shoshana Netanyahu (born 1923), Israeli lawyer and judge, a former justice of the Supreme Court of Israel
 Shoshana Persitz (1892–1969), Zionist activist, educator and Israeli politician
 Shoshana Ribner (1938–2007), Israeli Olympic swimmer
 Shoshana Riseman (born 1948), Israeli music educator, stage director and composer
 Shoshana Rudiakov (1948–2012), Latvian pianist
 Shoshannah Stern (born 1980), American actress
 Shoshana Zuboff (born 1951), professor of Business Administration at the Harvard Business School

Fictional characters
 Shoshanna Dreyfus, the French Jew who is the female protagonist of the 2009 movie, Inglourious Basterds
 Shoshanna Shapiro, the youngest member of the group of friends in HBO's Girls
 Shoshanna, the name of Upskirt Kurt's seaplane in the Bob's Burgers episode "Seaplane!"
 Shoshanna, Snake's girlfriend in the Simpsons episode "Bart Sells His Soul"
 Shoshana, a cafe owner on Rechov Sumsum, as portrayed on Shalom Sesame by Shosha Goren
 Shoshana Schoenbaum, therapist and alter of Tara Gregson on United States of Tara
 Shoshanna, a character on Nigerian soap opera, Tinsel
 Shoshanna, the daughter of Waverly in The Joy Luck Club
 Shoshanna, the girlfriend of Klaus in American Dad!

See also
 Susannah (given name)
 Shoshana Foundation, non-profit organization founded in 1986 upon the death of Richard F. Gold who was a long time administrator at both the New York City Opera and Chamber Opera Theater of New York
 Sookie, a given name that is derived from Shoshana

References

Given names derived from plants or flowers
Hebrew feminine given names
Jewish feminine given names